Bat bombs were an experimental World War II weapon developed by the United States. The bomb consisted of a bomb-shaped casing with over a thousand compartments, each containing a hibernating Mexican free-tailed bat with a small, timed incendiary bomb attached. The incendiaries, which were set on timers, would then ignite and start fires in inaccessible places in the largely wood and paper constructions of the Japanese cities that were the weapon's intended target. The United States Navy took control in August 1943, using the code name ProjectX-Ray.

Conception
The bat bomb was conceived by Lytle S. Adams (1881-1970), a dental surgeon from Irwin, Pennsylvania who was an acquaintance of First Lady Eleanor Roosevelt. The inspiration for Adams' suggestion was a trip he took to Carlsbad Caverns National Park, which is home to many bats. Adams wrote about his idea of incendiary bats in a letter to the White House in January 1942—little more than a month after the attack on Pearl Harbor. Adams was intrigued by the strength of bats and knew that they roosted before dawn. He also knew that most of the buildings in Tokyo were constructed of wood instead of concrete. He believed that if time-release incendiaries could be attached to bats, some kind of container holding them could be dropped over the city after dark and the bats would simply roost and burn Tokyo to the ground. The plan was subsequently approved by President Roosevelt on the advice of Donald Griffin.
In his letter, Adams stated that the bat was the "lowest form of animal life", and that, until now, "reasons for its creation have remained unexplained". He went on to espouse that bats were created "by God to await this hour to play their part in the scheme of free human existence, and to frustrate any attempt of those who dare desecrate our way of life."
Of Adams, Roosevelt remarked, "This man is not a nut. It sounds like a perfectly wild idea but is worth looking into."

After government approval

After Roosevelt gave the project his approval, it was relegated to the authority of the United States Army Air Force. Adams assembled the workers for the project, including the mammalogist Jack von Bloeker, actor Tim Holt, a former gangster, and a former hotel manager, among others. Von Bloeker, his assistant, Jack Couffer, and Ozro Wiswell, a scientist, self-described "bat lovers", noted that it did not occur to them to question the "morality or the ecological consequences of sacrificing a few million bats". For the duration of the project, many members enlisted in the Air Force, where Adams quickly promoted them to "acting" non-commissioned officers.

The team had to determine several variables to make the project feasible, including what kind of incendiaries could be attached to the bats, as well as the temperatures at which to store and transport them. They also had to decide what species of bat to use for the bombs. After testing several species, the Mexican free-tailed bat was selected. Adams had to ask for permission from the National Park Service to harvest large numbers of Mexican free-tailed bats from caves on government property. While the original plan was to arm the bats with white phosphorus, American chemist Louis Fieser joined the team and white phosphorus was replaced with his invention, napalm.

The napalm was stored in small cellulose containers dubbed "H-2 units". After trying several attachment methods, they decided to attach the H-2 unit to the bats using an adhesive, gluing them to the front of the bats.

In total, each bomb carrier could hold 1,040 bats. It was planned that the carrier would be deployed from an airplane, descending to an altitude of  before deploying parachutes. The sides of the bomb carrier would then fall away, allowing the bats to disperse.

Setbacks and transfer to US Navy

A series of tests to answer various operational questions were conducted. In one incident, the Carlsbad Army Airfield Auxiliary Air Base near Carlsbad, New Mexico, was set on fire on May 15, 1943, when armed bats were accidentally released. The bats roosted under a fuel tank and incinerated the test range.

Following this setback, the project was relegated to the Navy in August 1943, who renamed it Project X-Ray, and then passed it to the Marine Corps that December. The Marine Corps moved operations to the Marine Corps Air Station at El Centro, California. After several experiments and operational adjustments, the definitive test was carried out on the "Japanese Village", a mockup of a Japanese city built by the Chemical Warfare Service at their Dugway Proving Ground test site in Utah.

Observers at this test produced optimistic accounts. The chief of incendiary testing at Dugway wrote:

The National Defense Research Committee observer stated: "It was concluded that X-Ray is an effective weapon." The chief chemist's report stated that, on a weight basis, X-Ray was more effective than the standard incendiary bombs in use at the time: "Expressed in another way, the regular bombs would give probably 167 to 400 fires per bomb load where X-Ray would give 3,625 to 4,748 fires."

More tests were scheduled for mid-1944, but the program was canceled by Fleet Admiral Ernest J. King when he heard that it would likely not be combat ready until mid-1945. By that time, it was estimated that $2 million (equivalent to $ million today) had been spent on the project. It is thought that development of the bat bomb was moving too slowly, and was overtaken in the race for a quick end to the war by the atomic bomb project. Japan could have been devastated, yet with small loss of life."

The infamous "Invasion by Bats" project was afterwards referred to by Stanley P. Lovell, director of research and development for Office of Strategic Services, whom General Donovan ordered to review the idea, as "Die Fledermaus Farce". Lovell also mentioned that bats during testing were dropping to the ground like stones.

See also

 Animal-borne bomb attacks
 Anti-tank dog
 Explosive rat
 Harald Hardrada (using birds in a siege) 
 Japanese Balloon Bombs
 Military animals
 Olga of Kiev (using "pigeons or sparrows" as offensive weapons in the 900s AD)
 Project Pigeon

References

Animal cruelty incidents
Animal-borne bombs
Bats and humans
Incendiary weapons
Military animals
Weapon guidance
World War II weapons of the United States